John ('Wichita Bill') Noble was born in 1874 to an upper-middle-class family that had emigrated from England.  He was a noted post-impressionist painter of cowboys, sunrises and seascapes.  He wore a five-gallon hat and called himself the "first white child born in Wichita."

He often advised prospective customers not to buy his paintings.  He often slashed them up and sometimes even bought back pictures he had sold, just to mutilate them.

Noble worked in the late 1890s as a photographer and artist in Wichita, Kansas.  While there, he painted a saloon nude (Cleopatra at the Roman Bath) that came to be notoriously condemned and defaced by Carrie Nation, and a larger-than-life-sized portrait of Albert Pike which still hangs in the reception room of the Wichita Consistory.

He went to France in 1903 at age 29. where he took on the fictionalized persona of "Wichita Bill."  He studied at the Académie Julien under Jean-Paul Laurens and befriended fellow American artists George Luks and Richard E. Miller.

He married Amelia Peiche, of Strasbourg, France, in 1909.  At the outbreak of World War I, they moved to England.

Noble had exhibitions of his work at the Daniel Gallery (1920), the Rehn Galleries (1922), and the Milch Galleries (1925).

He was survived by his widow, two children, John and Towanda, two sisters, Mrs. Bert McCausland and Elizabeth Noble, and one brother, Arthur, all of Wichita.  His son, John A. Noble (1913–1983), was also a well-known artist and lithographer and is the namesake of the Noble Maritime Collection.

In 1941, his widow found a landscape of a sunrise over Boulogne, France that he had painted in the collection of William Randolph Hearst.  It had been badly retouched, so she bought it, cut out and saved the sunrise from the center of the canvas that had not been retouched, and then took a carving knife and slashed the rest to ribbons.

An Artist's Memory
In "Artist In Manhattan" Jerome Myers recalls his friendship with Noble. "The name of John Noble first became known to me through
an early portrait which George Luks painted of him, called
"Whiskey Bill." The thin, sensitive face was so unlike the Noble
whom I knew many years later, when he returned from abroad.
He came to see me, wearing his inevitable white sombrero and
flowing Windsor tie; a powerfully built man with the serious
face of a cleric under his hat, reminding me of Franz Liszt.
Noble was a fine athlete. With George Luks, he played in the
first professional baseball game in Paris. Alone, he rode his
white horse into the cafes of Paris, a veritable rough rider, the
idol of the French kids. Essentially, however, he was a religious
mystic.
The white horse went into his pictures as a poetic symbol.
His religious processions of Brittany, as well as his boats off the
Breton coast, were enveloped in a religious fog. In me John
found something—I know not what—that appealed to him;
perhaps it was something in my work that was attuned to his
idea of art, making me an exception in his almost wholesale
condemnation of his contemporaries.
John's violent encounters at the Salmagundi Club are
written large in the memory of that institution—outbursts
which were impelled by a fanatic devotion to art. At their
dinner, he yanked off the table cloth, carrying all the dishes
with it―an indirect though forcible criticism of Salmagundi's
art. Towards the end, a tragic brooding came over him. So great
was the interior struggle between the John Noble who once
fought off five policemen and the artist who painted
Provincetown bathed in moonlight, that at last it wore away his
resistance. Pathetically, desperately, he grasped at the grand
illusion of art that was his life. He truly died for a cause—and
that cause was the art of John Noble." "

Irving Stone's 1949 novel, The Passionate Journey is a biographical novel of John Noble's life.

Some of his paintings can be seen at the Wichita Art Museum.

References

External links
Wichita Art Museum

1874 births
1934 deaths
Artists from Wichita, Kansas
19th-century American painters
19th-century American male artists
American male painters
20th-century American painters
20th-century American male artists